Romeo Hoyt Freer (November 9, 1846 – May 9, 1913) was an American attorney, soldier turned pacifist, judge and politician. A Republican, Freer served one term in the U.S. House of Representatives representing West Virginia's 4th congressional district (1899–1901) and was Attorney General of West Virginia (1901–1905).

Early and military life
Born in Bazetta Township, Trumbull County, Ohio, Ohio on November 9, 1846, he was the son of Josiah D. Freer and Caroline P. Brown. The family soon relocated to Ashtabula County, Ohio, where Freer attended common schools. At the age of 15, he enlisted in the Union army through 1865. Wounded during the Battle of Gettysburg, he received an honorable discharge in 1866. Freer became a dedicated pacifist and determined isolationist for the rest of his life.

Career
In 1866, Freer moved to Charleston, West Virginia and began to study law. Admitted to the bar, Freer was elected the prosecuting attorney for Kanawha County in 1870. In 1872, he was a presidential elector for Ulysses S. Grant. President Grant appointed him U.S. Consul to Nicaragua until he resigned his duties in 1877 and accepted an appointment as Register of the Land Office for New Mexico. Freer resigned in 1879 after refusing orders that would lead to military conflict with Mexico.

Freer settled in Harrisville, Ritchie County, West Virginia in 1881 and married Mary Iams in 1884. That same year, he was a presidential elector for James G. Blaine. His isolationist policies proved to be divisive among voters, leading to his resignation from politics after the election.

Freer returned to politics by 1890 when he was elected to the West Virginia House of Delegates and later appointed prosecuting attorney for Ritchie County. In 1896, he was elected to the Fourth Judicial Circuit of West Virginia.

He served in the 56th United States Congress having been elected in 1898. In 1900, Freer was elected as Attorney General of West Virginia, and he served from 1901–1905. In 1902, he was briefly nominated for the Supreme Court by President McKinley.

From 1907 until his death he was postmaster of Harrisville.

Personal life
Freer married Mary Iams in 1884.

Death and legacy
Freer collapsed suddenly while in a meeting with business associates in 1913. He was pronounced dead at 3:57a.m. His autopsy showed acute necrosis of the small intestine and an abnormal mass in the stomach. Freer was buried with full military honors at Harrisville IOOF Cemetery.

See also
List of attorneys general of West Virginia

References

External links
Men of West Virginia, Vol. 1, pg. 17

1846 births
1913 deaths
19th-century American lawyers
20th-century American lawyers
American consuls
County prosecuting attorneys in West Virginia
West Virginia circuit court judges
Republican Party members of the West Virginia House of Delegates
People from Ashtabula County, Ohio
Politicians from Charleston, West Virginia
People from Harrisville, West Virginia
People from Trumbull County, Ohio
People of Ohio in the American Civil War
Union Army soldiers
West Virginia Attorneys General
West Virginia lawyers
19th-century American diplomats
Republican Party members of the United States House of Representatives from West Virginia
19th-century American politicians
Lawyers from Charleston, West Virginia
19th-century American judges
West Virginia postmasters
20th-century American politicians